The Westgate School is a mixed all-through school located in Winchester, Hampshire, United Kingdom.

History
The school was founded in the early 1900s as the Winchester County School for Girls, becoming Winchester County High School for Girls (WCHS) in 1936. By the 1970s it had 900 girls.

It had been a grammar school for girls only, until September 1973 when the first intake of comprehensive boys and girls entered the first year. At this point the school was renamed as The Westgate School. Many of the old grammar school teachers left in July 1974 to work in the neighbouring newly established sixth form college, the former Peter Symonds boys' grammar school. The Deputy Head, Miss Barbara Taylor, was one who made the move, but the Headmistress, Miss Sylvia Rowe, remained for several more years.

The last grammar school intake left in July 1977, leaving The Westgate School entirely comprehensive and co-ed from then on.

Peter Jenner was Headmaster at the school from 1983 to 2006, during its formative years as a comprehensive.

Achievements
In recent years between 75 and 80% of 15- and 16-year-olds have achieved five or more GCSE grades A* to C, 70-80% including Maths and English. According to the BBC league tables, Westgate is one of Hampshire's top state schools.

Notable former pupils

 Andy Burrows (former drummer for the band Razorlight)
 Lucy Pinder (British glamour model)
 Philippa Forrester (British TV presenter and co-producer)
 Tom Hayes (trader) (Former trader who was arrested, tried, sentenced to 14 years in prison for role in the Libor Scandal)
Rick Adams (Television presenter, DJ and producer)

Winchester County High School for Girls
 Gillian Ashmore (nee Oxenham), Chief Executive from 2001-2 of the Equal Opportunities Commission, and Regional Director from 1994-8 of the Government Office for South East England
 Diane Corner, Deputy Head of the United Nations Multidimensional Integrated Stabilization Mission in the Central African Republic since 2014, High Commissioner to Tanzania from 2009-13
 Dame Myra Curtis, Principal from 1942-54 of Newnham College, Cambridge
 Julia Darling, novelist
 Dame Julie Mellor, Chair from 1999-2005 of the Equal Opportunities Commission
 Alex Mitchell (née Beale, 1947–2010), former editor of Christian monthly magazine Third Way
 Winifred Moberly, Principal from 1919-28 of St Hilda's College, Oxford
 Jane Reynolds, Chief Executive from 1991-2000 of the Royal Masonic Benevolent Institution
 Marion Richardson, artist
 Prof Jocelyn Toynbee, Laurence Professor of Classical Archaeology from 1951-62 at the University of Cambridge

References
 OFTSED Report

External links
 School website
 History of the school
 EduBase

Schools in Winchester
Secondary schools in Hampshire
Boarding schools in Hampshire
Educational institutions established in 1977
1977 establishments in England
Community schools in Hampshire
Primary schools in Hampshire